Eoalligator is an extinct genus of alligatoroid crocodilian from Paleocene deposits in China.

Systematics
Eoalligator was originally classified as an extinct relative of alligators. The holotype of E. chunyii, IVPP V2716, is a partial skeleton. A second nominal species, E. huiningensis, was described in 1982 from Anhui. A 2016 study of Chinese alligators by Wang et al. found Eoalligator chunyii to be a junior synonym of Asiatosuchus nanlingensis and a basal member of Crocodylidae.  However, a subsequent study by Wu et al. disagreed with the synonymy of "Asiatosuchus" nanlingensis and Eoalligator chunyii, finding them to be distinct based on first-hand studies of the holotypes and cladistic analysis, although they agreed in classifying E. chunyii as a crocodyloid. In 2016, Wang et al. also found Eoalligator huiningensis to be an alligatoroid distinct from E. chunyii, and thus moved Eoalligator huiningensis to the new genus Protoalligator.

A 2019 study by Massonne et al. included additional taxa from Southeast Asia and found Eoalligator and Protoalligator to be related and as basal members of Alligatoroidea, as shown in the cladogram below:

References

Crocodilians
Paleocene crocodylomorphs
Prehistoric pseudosuchian genera
Paleocene reptiles of Asia
Paleogene China
Fossils of China
Fossil taxa described in 1964